The Cape Government Railways 4th Class 4-6-0TT of 1880 was a South African steam locomotive from the pre-Union era in the Cape of Good Hope.

In 1880 and 1881, the Cape Government Railways placed eighteen 4th Class  tank-and-tender locomotives in mainline service on its Midland and Eastern Systems, working out of Port Elizabeth and East London respectively. It was the first South African locomotive to be built to a local design. Four of these locomotives were still in service to come onto the South African Railways roster in 1912.

Manufacturer
Increasing traffic and heavier loads on the Cape Government Railways (CGR) lines into the interior from Port Elizabeth on the Midland System and East London on the Eastern System, led to a requirement for larger and more powerful locomotives by the late 1870s.

The 4th Class  tank-and-tender locomotive was designed by Michael Stephens, at that stage the Locomotive Superintendent of the Western System in Cape Town, and six locomotives were ordered from Robert Stephenson and Company in 1879. This was the first South African locomotive to be built to a local design, prepared in the CGR drawing office in Salt River. These were delivered to the Midland System in 1880, numbered in the range from M34 to M39.

They were followed by two more batches of six from the same manufacturer. The second batch was delivered to the Eastern System in 1880 and 1881, numbered in the range from E27 to E32, and the last batch to the Midland System in 1881, numbered in the range from M50 to M55.

Characteristics
These locomotives, which used Stephenson valve gear, were intended for freight work. The locomotives delivered to the Midland System had coupled wheels of  diameter, while those delivered to the Eastern System where grades were much more severe, had coupled wheels of  diameter.

All the locomotives were delivered with optional three-axle tenders and, depending on the task at hand and the distance involved, could be used in either the tank engine or the tank-and-tender configuration. To facilitate easy uncoupling from the tender and direct coupling to rolling stock while working as a tank engine, the engine-to-tender couplings were Johnston link-and-pin couplers instead of the more usual drawbar. Each side of the cab was equipped with a side entrance and double handrails to allow easy access or egress to the crew while working without a tender.

These locomotives were the first in South Africa to be equipped with compensated spring gear on all coupled wheels. Their coupling rods extended from crank-pin to crank-pin, with no knuckle joints. Two inverted laminated springs carried the vertical load.

Since the engine did not have a coal bunker, photographs of a locomotive working in the tank engine configuration will sometimes show the engine with a bag of coal slung onto the side tanks or stowed on the running boards. These locomotives retained their side-tanks throughout their working lives.

Modifications

J.D. Tilney, the Eastern System's Locomotive Superintendent, carried out several experiments on some of these 4th Class locomotives. One of the modifications introduced by Tilney was an extended smokebox to make room for a very efficient spark arrester, constructed of wire mesh. In 1882, he reported that grass fires caused by locomotives had been rarely known since the spark-arresters were installed. Several locomotives on the Eastern and Midland Systems were altered to incorporate these spark arresters.

Another modification involved modifying the boiler and frame to accommodate oscillating firebars and a larger firebox to overcome the problems associated with the low-grade local coal from the Cyphergat collieries. Mechanical firegrate shaking was accomplished by means of a collar on the leading coupled axle which could be engaged by a roller with eccentrically mounted connecting rods to the oscillating firebars. The drawings to illustrate the operation of the oscillating firebars were published in Mechanical Engineers in 1890.

Service

Cape Government Railways
At the time the 4th Class entered service, the Eastern System's lines were open to King William's Town and approaching Queenstown, with the latter being opened on 5 May 1880. The Midland System's lines were completed to Graaff Reinet and Cookhouse respectively.

During their service lives on the CGR, all these locomotives were renumbered more than once. By 1886, the system prefixes had been done away with and the Midland System's locomotives had all been renumbered by replacing the letter prefix "M" with the numeral "1". By 1888, the six Eastern System locomotives had been renumbered into the 600 number range. The Midland System locomotives were renumbered twice more, into the 200 number range by 1890 and into the 400 number range by 1899.

By 1899, the first batch of six locomotives of the Midland System was no longer reflected in the locomotive register. By 1904, all six of the Eastern System were gone from the register as well.

South African Railways
When the Union of South Africa was established on 31 May 1910, the three Colonial government railways (CGR, Natal Government Railways and Central South African Railways) were united under a single administration to control and administer the railways, ports and harbours of the Union. Although the South African Railways and Harbours came into existence in 1910, the actual classification and renumbering of all the rolling stock of the three constituent railways was only implemented with effect from 1 January 1912.

By 1912, four locomotives survived, numbers 451 to 454. They were considered obsolete by the SAR, designated Class 04 and renumbered by having the numeral "0" prefixed to their existing numbers.

Works numbers
The works numbers, years built, original numbers and renumbering of the Cape 4th Class of 1880 are listed in the table.

Illustration
The photograph illustrates a modified locomotive with an extended smokebox, working without its tender. Note the coal bag on the side tank.

References

0330
0330
4-6-0 locomotives
2′C n2t locomotives
Robert Stephenson and Company locomotives
Cape gauge railway locomotives
Railway locomotives introduced in 1880
1880 in South Africa
Scrapped locomotives